Syed Faizul Karim (born 10 January 1973) is a Bangladeshi Islamic scholar and politician. He is known as Shaikh-e-Charmonai to his supporters. He is serving as Senior Vice President of Islami Andolan Bangladesh. He is also the Vice President of Bangladesh Mujahid Committee and Bangladesh Quran Education Board and Central Member of Befaqul Madarisil Arabia Bangladesh. During his student life, he served as the central president of the Islami Chhatra Andolan Bangladesh.

Early life and family 
Faizul Karim was born on 10 January 1973 in Char Monai Union of Barisal district. He belonged to a Bengali Muslim family who were the hereditary Pirs of Charmonai, with his great grandfather, Sayed Amjad Ali, being a descendant of Ali, the fourth Caliph of Islam. His father, Syed Fazlul Karim, and grandfather, Syed Muhammad Ishaq, were the leaders of the Charmonai Darbar. He has a total of 6 brothers and 1 sister, including Syed Rezaul Karim.

Education 
He started his education from Jamia Rashidia Islamia Charmonai, founded by his grandfather. He passed Kamil from its Alia branch in 1995. He also attended classes in its Qawmi branch. After that, he passed first division in Fiqh and Hadith from Sagardi Islamia Kamil Madrasa, Barisal. He studied at Jamia Islamia Darul Uloom Madania for some time.

Career 
After completing his education, he joined Charmonai Jamia Rashidia Islamia as a teacher in Alia branch. Later, he was the assistant principal of both Alia and Qawmi branches for a long time. After his father's death on 25 November 2006, he held various positions in Islami Andolan Bangladesh and Bangladesh Mujahid Committee. He was involved in Islami Chhatra Andolan Bangladesh since his student life. Later he served as the President of its Central Committee.

Controversy

University of Dhaka 
In 2016, a lot of controversy arose over a speech he gave about University of Dhaka. Where he claimed, University of Dhaka could not be established in 1911 due to the opposition of Hindus. The foundation stone of DU was laid in 1921 on the proposal of a Muslim man, Khwaja Salimullah. So it is a Muslim university and no atheist can live there. Regarding the curriculum, he said, "A syllabus that does not include the biography of the Prophet (PBUH), does not include the biography of Umar, does not include the biography of such great people - such syllabus books will not be taught or even allowed to be read in Bangladesh."

Sculpture row 
On 13 November 2020, he opposed the sculpture of Sheikh Mujibur Rahman under the construction in Gandaria in Jatrabari. Later, a national debate started. After various reactions, sedition case was filed against him and the PBI took the investigation into the case.

See also 
 Syed Fazlul Karim

References

External links 
 Interview at Kaler Kantho

1973 births
20th-century Bangladeshi people
21st-century Bangladeshi politicians
Bangladeshi Sunni Muslims
Bengali politicians
Living people
Bangladeshi Islamic religious leaders
Deobandis
20th-century Muslim scholars of Islam
People from Barisal District
Bangladeshi Sunni Muslim scholars of Islam
Sunni Muslim scholars of Islam
Hanafis
Chormonai movement
20th-century Bengalis
21st-century Bengalis
Bangladeshi people of Arab descent
Bengali Muslim scholars of Islam